The Sweitzer Hills are a low and short mountain range within the Capay Valley, in northern Yolo County, California.

They are in the Inner Northern California Coast Ranges System.

References 

Hills of California
Mountain ranges of Yolo County, California
Mountain ranges of Northern California